The second season of the reality television series Black Ink Crew: Chicago aired on VH1 from  October 3, 2016, until November 28, 2016. It chronicles the daily operations and staff drama at an African American owned and operated tattoo shop 9MAG in Chicago, Illinois.

Main cast
 Ryan Henry
 Katrina Jackson
 Van Johnson
 Phor Brumfield
 Don Brumfield
 Charmaine Walker
 Danielle Jamison

Recurring cast
 Ashley Pickens
 Terrance
 Cobra Kat
 Junior Diaz
 Whitney Womack
 Ariel

Episodes

References

2016 American television seasons
Black Ink Crew